FC Starye Dorogi is a Belarusian football club based in Staryya Darohi (Starye Dorogi), Minsk Region.

History
FC Starye Dorogi was formed in 1986 as Vympel Starye Dorogi and started playing in Belarusian SSR Top League the same year. In 1987, the team was renamed to Stroitel Starye Dorogi.

Since 1992, Stroitel was playing in the Belarusian Premier League. They spent there three seasons until the relegation in 1994. Since then the club's results were getting progressively worse. Between 1994 and 1997, Stroitel was playing in the Belarusian First League. In 1996, they lost all 24 games and finished in last, 13th place, but were saved from relegation due to the First League expansion to 16 teams. In 1997, they again finished last and got relegated to the Second League.

Stroitel played in the Second league until 2000. Since 2000, they changed their name to FC Starye Dorogi, and since 2001, they play on amateur level in Minsk Oblast Top League, which is a part of KFK (4th level of Belarusian league system).

Name changes
1986: formed as Vympel Starye Dorogi
1987: renamed to Stroitel Starye Dorogi
2000: renamed to Starye Dorogi

League and Cup history

1 Finished last but saved from relegation due to league expansion from 13 to 16 teams.
2 Last round match cancelled and never replayed.

References

External links
Profile at footballfacts.ru

Association football clubs established in 1986
Defunct football clubs in Belarus
1986 establishments in Belarus
Association football clubs disestablished in 2000
Staryya Darohi District